Phalaenopsis lindenii is a species of plant in the family Orchidaceae, named after Belgian botanist Jean Jules Linden. It is endemic to the island of Luzon in the Philippines.  Its natural habitat is subtropical or tropical moist lowland forests. It is threatened by habitat loss.

References

External links

Orchids of the Philippines
lindenii
Flora of Luzon
Endemic flora of the Philippines
Taxonomy articles created by Polbot